Stanley Hugh Gallimore (14 April 1910 – September 1994) was an English footballer. His regular position was as a forward. He was born in Bucklow Hill, Cheshire and died in the Trafford district of Cheshire. He played for Witton Albion, Manchester United, Altrincham and Northwich Victoria.

He joined Manchester United from Witton Albion in September 1929 and made his first team debut at West Ham United on 11 October 1930. He went on to make a total of 76 appearances scoring 20 goals of which 1 was scored in the 4 F.A. Cup ties he played in.

References

External links
MUFCInfo.com profile

1910 births
1994 deaths
English footballers
Witton Albion F.C. players
Manchester United F.C. players
Altrincham F.C. players
Northwich Victoria F.C. players
Association football forwards